Thomas Preston (died c. 1563) was an English organist and composer who held posts at Magdalen College, Oxford, Trinity College, Cambridge, and St George's Chapel at Windsor Castle.

The anonymous ground for keyboard Uppon la mi re (MB, LXVI, 1995) in the collection Add.29996 (London British Library) is often attributed to him.

Further reading
Ian Payne, "Instrumental Music at Trinity College, Cambridge, c. 1594-c.1615: Archival and Biographical Evidence," Music and Letters 68 (1987), pp. 128–140.
 John Caldwell. "Preston, Thomas." Grove Music Online. Oxford Music Online. Oxford University Press. Web. 12 Jan. 2013.

External links
 Brief biography at "Here of a Sunday Morning"
 IMSLP Free scores, Ground Upon la mi re.

Composers for pipe organ
16th-century English composers
English male composers
English organists
British male organists
1560s deaths
Year of birth unknown
Year of death uncertain